The Africa Netball World Cup Qualifiers were held in Pretoria, South Africa, between 21 August and 27 August 2022, with nine teams taking part. South Africa, while still participating in the tournament, had already qualified for the World Cup due to being the hosts, leaving eight teams to compete for two qualifying places.

Teams competed in two pools, with each team playing every other team in the pool. At the end of the pool stage, the first-placed team in each pool played the second-placed team of the other pool, with the winners playing each other in the final and the remaining teams playing each other to determine 3rd through 9th place. The top two teams of the tournament (excluding South Africa) qualified for the Netball World Cup.

Pool A

Standings

Matches

Pool B

Standings

Matches

Placement matches and finals

7th-9th place

5th-6th place

Semi-finals

3rd/4th place

Final

Final placings

References 

2022 in netball
Netball
Netball
Netball
Africa
International netball competitions hosted by South Africa